In Greek mythology, Tethys was a Titan daughter of Uranus and Gaia, a sister and wife of the Titan Oceanus, and the mother of the river gods and the Oceanids. Although Tethys had no active role in Greek mythology and no established cults, she was depicted in mosaics decorating baths, pools, and triclinia in the Greek East, particularly in Antioch and its suburbs, either alone or with Oceanus.

Genealogy
Tethys was one of the Titan offspring of Uranus (Sky) and Gaia (Earth). Hesiod lists her Titan siblings as Oceanus, Coeus, Crius, Hyperion, Iapetus, Theia, Rhea, Themis, Mnemosyne, Phoebe, and Cronus. Tethys married her brother Oceanus, an enormous river encircling the world, and was by him the mother of numerous sons (the river gods) and numerous daughters (the Oceanids).

According to Hesiod, there were three thousand (i.e. innumerable) river gods. These included Achelous, the god of the Achelous River, the largest river in Greece, who gave his daughter in marriage to Alcmaeon and was defeated by Heracles in a wrestling contest for the right to marry Deianira; Alpheus, who fell in love with the nymph Arethusa and pursued her to Syracuse, where she was transformed into a spring by Artemis; and Scamander who fought on the side of the Trojans during the Trojan War and, offended when Achilles polluted his waters with a large number of Trojan corpses, overflowed his banks nearly drowning Achilles.

According to Hesiod, there were also three thousand Oceanids. These  included Metis, Zeus' first wife, whom Zeus impregnated with Athena and then swallowed; Eurynome, Zeus' third wife, and mother of the Charites; Doris, the wife of Nereus and mother of the Nereids; Callirhoe, the wife of Chrysaor and mother of Geryon; Clymene, the wife of Iapetus, and mother of Atlas, Menoetius, Prometheus, and Epimetheus; Perseis, wife of Helios and mother of Circe and Aeetes; Idyia, wife of Aeetes and mother of Medea; and Styx, goddess of the river Styx, and the wife of Pallas and mother of Zelus, Nike, Kratos, and Bia.

Primeval mother?
Passages in book 14 of the  Iliad, called the Deception of Zeus, suggest the possibility that Homer knew a tradition in which Oceanus and Tethys (rather than Uranus and Gaia, as in Hesiod) were the primeval parents of the gods. Twice Homer has Hera describe the pair as "Oceanus, from whom the gods are sprung, and mother Tethys". According to M. L. West, these lines suggests a myth in which Oceanus and Tethys are the "first parents of the whole race of gods." However, as Timothy Gantz points out, "mother" could simply refer to the fact that Tethys was Hera's foster mother for a time, as Hera tells us in the lines immediately following, while the reference to Oceanus as the genesis of the gods "might be simply a formulaic epithet indicating the numberless rivers and springs descended from Okeanos" (compare with Iliad 21.195–197). But, in a later Iliad passage, Hypnos also describes Oceanus as "genesis for all", which, according to Gantz, is hard to understand as meaning other than that, for Homer, Oceanus was the father of the Titans.

Plato, in his Timaeus, provides a genealogy (probably Orphic) which perhaps reflected an attempt to reconcile this apparent divergence between Homer and Hesiod, in which Uranus and Gaia are the parents of Oceanus and Tethys, and Oceanus and Tethys are the parents of Cronus and Rhea and the other Titans, as well as Phorcys. In his  Cratylus, Plato quotes Orpheus as saying that Oceanus and Tethys were "the first to marry", possibly also reflecting an Orphic theogony in which Oceanus and Tethys—rather than Uranus and Gaia—were the primeval parents. Plato's apparent inclusion of Phorkys as a Titan (being the brother of Cronus and Rhea), and the mythographer Apollodorus's inclusion of Dione, the mother of Aphrodite by Zeus, as a thirteenth Titan, suggests an Orphic tradition in which Hesiod's twelve Titans were the offspring of Oceanus and Tethys, with Phorkys and Dione taking the place of Oceanus and Tethys.

According to Epimenides, the first two beings, Night and Aer, produced Tartarus, who in turn produced two Titans (possibly Oceanus and Tethys) from whom came the world egg.

Mythology

Tethys played no active part in Greek mythology. The only early story concerning Tethys is what Homer has Hera briefly relate in the Iliad’s Deception of Zeus passage. There, Hera says that when Zeus was in the process of deposing Cronus, she was given by her mother Rhea to Tethys and Oceanus for safekeeping and that they "lovingly nursed and cherished me in their halls". Hera relates this while dissembling that she is on her way to visit Oceanus and Tethys in the hopes of reconciling her foster parents, who are angry with each other and are no longer having sexual relations.

Originally Oceanus' consort, at a later time Tethys came to be identified with the sea, and in Hellenistic and Roman poetry Tethys' name came to be used as a poetic term for the sea.

The only other story involving Tethys is an apparently late astral myth concerning the polar constellation Ursa Major (the Great Bear), which was thought to represent the catasterism of  Callisto who was transformed into a bear and placed by Zeus among the stars. The myth explains why the constellation never sets below the horizon, saying that since Callisto had been Zeus's lover, she was forbidden by Tethys from "touching Ocean's deep" out of concern for her foster-child Hera, Zeus's jealous wife.

Claudian wrote that Tethys nursed two of her nephlings in her breast, Helios and Selene, the children of her siblings Hyperion and Theia, during their infancy, when their light was weak and had not yet grown into their older, more luminous selves.

In Ovid's Metamorphoses, Tethys turns Aesacus into a diving bird.

Tethys was sometimes confused with another sea goddess, the sea-nymph Thetis, wife of Peleus and mother of Achilles.

Tethys as Tiamat
M. L. West detects in the Iliad's Deception of Zeus passage an allusion to a possible archaic myth "according to which [Tethys] was the mother of the gods, long estranged from her husband," speculating that the estrangement might refer to a separation of "the upper and lower waters ... corresponding to that of heaven and earth," which parallels the story of "Apsū and Tiamat in the Babylonian cosmology, the male and female waters, which were originally united (En. El. I. 1 ff.)," but that, "By Hesiod's time the myth may have been almost forgotten and Tethys remembered only as the name of Oceanus' wife." This possible correspondence between Oceanus and Tethys, and Apsū and Tiamat has been noticed by several authors, with Tethys' name possibly having been derived from that of Tiamat.

Iconography

Representations of Tethys before the Roman period are rare.
Tethys appears, identified by inscription (ΘΕΘΥΣ), as part of an illustration of the wedding of Peleus and Thetis on the early sixth-century BC Attic black-figure "Erskine" dinos by Sophilos (British Museum 1971.111–1.1). Accompanied by Eileithyia, the goddess of childbirth, Tethys follows close behind Oceanus at the end of a procession of gods invited to the wedding. Tethys is also conjectured to be represented in a similar illustration of the wedding  of Peleus and Thetis depicted on the  early sixth-century BC Attic black-figure François Vase (Florence 4209). Tethys probably also appeared as one of the gods fighting the Giants in the Gigantomachy frieze of the second-century BC Pergamon Altar. Only fragments of the figure remain: a part of a chiton below Oceanus' left arm and a hand clutching a large tree branch visible behind Oceanus' head.

During the second to fourth centuries AD, Tethys—sometimes with Oceanus, sometimes alone—became a relatively frequent feature of mosaics decorating baths, pools, and triclinia in the Greek East, particularly in Antioch and its suburbs.  Her identifying attributes are wings sprouting from her forehead, a rudder/oar, and  a ketos, a creature from Greek mythology with the head of a dragon and the body of a snake. The earliest of these mosaics, identified as Tethys, decorated a triclinium overlooking a pool, excavated from the House of the Calendar in Antioch, dated to shortly after AD 115 (Hatay Archaeology Museum 850). Tethys, reclining on the left, with Oceanus reclining on the right, has long hair, a winged forehead, and is nude to the waist with draped legs. A ketos twines around her raised right arm. Other mosaics of Tethys with Oceanus include Hatay Archaeology Museum 1013 (from the House of Menander, Daphne), Hatay Archaeology Museum 9095, and Baltimore Museum of Art 1937.126 (from the House of the Boat of Psyches: triclinium).

In other mosaics, Tethys appears without Oceanus.  One of these is a fourth-century AD mosaic from a pool (probably a public bath) found at Antioch, now installed in Boston, Massachusetts at the Harvard Business School's Morgan Hall and formerly at Dumbarton Oaks, Washington, D.C. (Dumbarton Oaks 76.43). Besides the Sophilos dinos, this is the only other representation of Tethys identified by inscription. Here Tethys, with a winged forehead, rises from the sea bare-shouldered, with long dark hair parted in the middle. A golden rudder rests against her right shoulder. Others include Hatay Archaeology Museum 9097, Shahba Museum (in situ), Baltimore Museum of Art 1937.118 (from the House of the Boat of Psyches: Room six), and Memorial Art Gallery 42.2.

Toward the end of the period represented by these mosaics, Tethys' iconography appears to merge with that of another sea goddess Thalassa, the Greek personification of the sea (thalassa being the Greek word for the sea). Such a transformation would be consistent with the frequent use of Tethys' name as a poetic reference to the sea in Roman poetry (see above).

Modern use of the name
Tethys, a moon of the planet Saturn, and the prehistoric Tethys Ocean are named after this goddess.

Notes

References
 Aeschylus(?), Prometheus Bound in Aeschylus, with an English translation by Herbert Weir Smyth, Ph. D. in two volumes. Vol 2. Cambridge, Massachusetts, Harvard University Press. 1926. Online version at the Perseus Digital Library.
 Aeschylus, Persians. Seven against Thebes. Suppliants. Prometheus Bound. Edited and translated by Alan H. Sommerstein. Loeb Classical Library No. 145. Cambridge, Massachusetts: Harvard University Press, 2009. . Online version at Harvard University Press.
 Apollodorus, Apollodorus, The Library, with an English Translation by Sir James George Frazer, F.B.A., F.R.S. in 2 Volumes. Cambridge, Massachusetts, Harvard University Press; London, William Heinemann Ltd. 1921. Online version at the Perseus Digital Library.
 Apollonius of Rhodes, Apollonius Rhodius: the Argonautica, translated by Robert Cooper Seaton, W. Heinemann, 1912. Internet Archive.
 Beazley, John Davidson, The Development of Attic Black-figure, Volume 24, University of California Press, 1951. .
 Budelmann, Felix and Johannes Haubold, "Reception and Tradition" in A Companion to Classical Receptions, edited by Lorna Hardwick and Christopher Stray, pp. 13–25. John Wiley & Sons, 2011. .
 Burkert, Walter The Orientalizing Revolution: Near Eastern Influence on Greek Culture in the Early archaic Age, Harvard University Press, 1992, pp. 91–93.
 Cahn, Herbert A., "Thalassa", in Lexicon Iconographicum Mythologiae Classicae (LIMC) VIII.1 Artemis Verlag, Zürich and Munich, 1997. .
 Caldwell, Richard, Hesiod's Theogony, Focus Publishing/R. Pullins Company (June 1, 1987). .
 Callimachus, Callimachus and Lycophron with an English translation by A. W. Mair ; Aratus, with an English translation by G. R. Mair, London: W. Heinemann, New York: G. P. Putnam 1921. Internet Archive
 Campbell, Sheila D. (1988), The Mosaics of Antioch, PIMS. .
 Campbell, Sheila D. (1998), The Mosaics of Anemurium, PIMS. .
 Carpenter, Thomas H., Dionysian Imagery in Archaic Greek Art: Its Development in Black-Figure Vase Painting, Clarendon Press, 1986. .
 Diodorus Siculus, Diodorus Siculus: The Library of History. Translated by C. H. Oldfather. Twelve volumes. Loeb Classical Library. Cambridge, Massachusetts: Harvard University Press; London: William Heinemann, Ltd. 1989. Vol. 3. Books 4.59–8. . Online version at Bill Thayer's Web Site
 Eraslan, Şehnaz.  "Oceanus, Tethys and Thalssa Figures in the Light of Antioch and Zeugma Mosaics.", in: Journal of International Social Research 8.37 (2015), pp. 454–461.
 Fowler, R. L. (2000), Early Greek Mythography: Volume 1: Text and Introduction, Oxford University Press, 2000. .
 Fowler, R. L. (2013), Early Greek Mythography: Volume 2: Commentary, Oxford University Press, 2013. .
 Gantz, Timothy, Early Greek Myth: A Guide to Literary and Artistic Sources, Johns Hopkins University Press, 1996, Two volumes:  (Vol. 1),  (Vol. 2).
 Hard, Robin, The Routledge Handbook of Greek Mythology: Based on H.J. Rose's "Handbook of Greek Mythology", Psychology Press, 2004, .
 Hesiod, Theogony, in The Homeric Hymns and Homerica with an English Translation by Hugh G. Evelyn-White, Cambridge, Massachusetts., Harvard University Press; London, William Heinemann Ltd. 1914. Online version at the Perseus Digital Library.
 Homer, The Iliad with an English Translation by A.T. Murray, Ph.D. in two volumes. Cambridge, Massachusetts., Harvard University Press; London, William Heinemann, Ltd. 1924. Online version at the Perseus Digital Library.
 Hyginus, Gaius Julius, Astronomica, in The Myths of Hyginus, edited and translated by Mary A. Grant, Lawrence: University of Kansas Press, 1960.
 Hyginus, Gaius Julius, Fabulae in Apollodorus' Library and Hyginus' Fabulae: Two Handbooks of Greek Mythology, Translated, with Introductions by R. Scott Smith and Stephen M. Trzaskoma, Hackett Publishing Company,  2007. .
 Homeric Hymn to Hermes (4), in The Homeric Hymns and Homerica with an English Translation by Hugh G. Evelyn-White, Cambridge, Massachusetts., Harvard University Press; London, William Heinemann Ltd. 1914. Online version at the Perseus Digital Library.
 Jentel, Marie-Odile, "Tethys I", in Lexicon Iconographicum Mythologiae Classicae (LIMC) VIII.1 Artemis Verlag, Zürich and Munich, 1997. .
 Kern, Otto. Orphicorum Fragmenta, Berlin, 1922. Internet Archive
 Kondoleon, Christine, Antioch: The Lost Ancient City, Princeton University Press, 2000. .
 Lycophron, Alexandra (or Cassandra) in Callimachus and Lycophron with an English translation by A. W. Mair ; Aratus, with an English translation by G. R. Mair, London: W. Heinemann, New York: G. P. Putnam 1921. Internet Archive
 Macrobius, Saturnalia, Volume II: Books 3-5, edited and translated by Robert A. Kaster, Loeb Classical Library No. 511, Cambridge, Massachusetts, Harvard University Press, 2011. Online version at Harvard University Press. .
 Matthews, Monica, Caesar and the Storm: A Commentary on Lucan, De Bello Civili, Book 5, Lines 476–721, Peter Lang, 2008. .
 Most, G.W., Hesiod, Theogony, Works and Days, Testimonia, Edited and translated by Glenn W. Most, Loeb Classical Library No. 57, Cambridge, Massachusetts, Harvard University Press, 2018. . Online version at Harvard University Press.
 Ovid, Ovid's Fasti: With an English translation by Sir James George Frazer, London: W. Heinemann LTD; Cambridge, Massachusetts: : Harvard University Press, 1959. Internet Archive.
 Ovid, Metamorphoses, Brookes More. Boston. Cornhill Publishing Co. 1922. Online version at the Perseus Digital Library.
 Plato, Cratylus in Plato in Twelve Volumes, Vol. 12 translated by Harold N. Fowler, Cambridge, Massachusetts, Harvard University Press; London, William Heinemann Ltd. 1925. Online version at the Perseus Digital Library.
 Plato, Critias in Plato in Twelve Volumes, Vol. 9 translated by W.R.M. Lamb. Cambridge, Massachusetts, Harvard University Press; London, William Heinemann Ltd. 1925. Online version at the Perseus Digital Library.
 Plato, Timaeus in Plato in Twelve Volumes, Vol. 9 translated by W.R.M. Lamb, Cambridge, Massachusetts, Harvard University Press; London, William Heinemann Ltd. 1925. Online version at the Perseus Digital Library.
 Claudian, Rape of Persephone in Claudian: Volume II. Translated by Platnauer, Maurice. Loeb Classical Library Volume 136. Cambridge, MA. Harvard Univserity Press. 1922.
 Pollitt, Jerome Jordan, Art in the Hellenistic Age, Cambridge University Press. .
 Queyrel, François, L'Autel de Pergame: Images et pouvoir en Grèce d'Asie, Paris:  Éditions A. et J. Picard, 2005. .
 Smith, William; Dictionary of Greek and Roman Biography and Mythology, London (1873).
 Wages, Sara M., “A Note on the Dumbarton Oaks ‘Tethys Mosaic’” in: Dumbarton Oaks Papers 40 (1986), pp. 119–128.
 West, M. L. (1966), Hesiod: Theogony, Oxford University Press.
 West, M. L. (1983), The Orphic Poems, Clarendon Press. .
 West, M. L. (1997), The East Face of Helicon: West Asiatic Elements in Greek Poetry and Myth, Oxford University Press. .
 Williams, Dyfri, "Sophilos in the British Museum" in Greek Vases In The J. Paul Getty Museum, Getty Publications, 1983, pp. 9–34. .

External links 

 TETHYS from The Theoi Project
 TETHYS from greekmythology.com
 TETHYS from Mythopedia

Titans (mythology)
Greek sea goddesses
Sea and river goddesses
Children of Gaia
Deities in the Iliad
Metamorphoses characters
Helios in mythology